Regimitra is a monospecific genus of velvet worm containing the single species Regimitra quadricaula. The males of this species have 15 pairs of legs, with the last pair fully developed; females have either 15 leg pairs, with the last pair clawed but reduced, or only 14 leg pairs, preceding a pair reduced to a lump without feet or claws. The type locality of this species is Tuggolo State Forest, New South Wales, Australia.

References

Further reading 
 

Onychophorans of Australasia
Onychophoran genera
Monotypic protostome genera
Fauna of New South Wales
Endemic fauna of Australia
Taxa named by Amanda Reid (malacologist)